Single-pass membrane and coiled-coil domain-containing protein 4 is a single-pass membrane protein with a colloid-coil domain containing protein 4. In humans it is encoded by the SMCO4 gene.  A single-pass transmembrane protein, means that one end of the protein will remain in the cytoplasm, while the other end is exposed to the cell exterior.

Gene properties 
The SMCO4 gene is located on chromosome 11, with specific chromosomal coordinates of 11q13.3-q23.3 in Homo sapiens. SMCO4 has two common aliases: C11orf75 (Chromosome 11 Open Reading Frame 75) and FN5.

mRNA features 
SMCO4 has 7 isoforms in Homo sapiens.  The SMCO4 isoform 1 has 9 exons, while the rest of the isoforms have varying amounts of exons.    These isoforms are listed in the table below, with their accession numbers for reference.

Protein 

MRQLKGKPKKETSKDKKERKQAMQEARQQITTVVLPTLAVVVLLIVVFVYVATRPTITE

The protein that is encoded by SMCO4 is rich in phosphorylable amino acids and has a high pH. There are no predicted protein repeats.  There is evidence that the protein is present in the outer membrane of the mitochondria. The absence of an N-terminal signal peptide shows that the protein does not have the ability to leave the organelle it is in, which correlates with the knowledge that it is a transmembrane protein.

Structure 
The structure of the FN5 protein is not yet known, but the protein qualities are useful in predicting the protein's structure.   There is no evidence that the protein would take on any Beta-turns;  its secondary structure would be composed of only alpha-helixes.  There are two separate helixes: the transmembrane helix and the alpha helix.

Expression

Expression analysis
SMCO4 expression in humans was predicted to be highest in the salivary glands.   Overall, there was RNA tissue expression shown in 37 human tissues and expression of the protein in 71 cell types.

Regulation of expression
SMCO4 is not ubiquitously expressed throughout humans.  There is evidence that the expression of SMCO4 is easily manipulated by many different factors, making constant expression unlikely.  One example of this expression regulation comes from an experiment that showed increased SMCO4 expression in the presence of Gamma-tocotrienol.

Predicted interactions 
SMCO4 is predicted to interact with the following proteins:

Conservation 
Two microRNAs, miR-124-3p.1 and miR-183-5p.1, are thought to be highly conserved throughout variety of vertebrates.   TheseicroRio RNAs are both neuronal in nature.

Orthologs 
Orthologs of SMCO4 were found in a variety of species, including mammals, birds, reptiles, amphibians, insects and parasites.  The primates were consistently found to have the highest sequence identity with the human SMCO4 sequence, followed closely by an extinct fish species called Latimeria chalumnae.  There was no evidence of SMCO4 presence in yeast species.

References 

Human proteins